Nadezhda Fyodorovna Olizarenko (Russian: Надежда Фёдоровна Олизаренко, Ukrainian: Надія Федорівна Олізаренко; née Mushta; 28 November 1953 – 18 February 2017) was a Soviet middle-distance runner. At the 1980 Olympics she won the 800 m event, setting a world record at 1:53.43, and finished third in the 1500 m. Her 800 m world record was improved in 1983, but still remains the second-best time over that distance.  Other than world record holder Jarmila Kratochvílová in 1983, only two athletes, Pamela Jelimo of Kenya, in 2008, and Caster Semenya of South Africa, in 2018, have come within a second of Olizarenko's mark since it was set.

Olizarenko won the 1986 European title in the 800 m, but failed to reach the final in this event at the 1988 Olympics. She still holds the world record in the 4×800 m relay set in 1984.

Biography
Olizarenko took up athletics in 1967, together with her sister Natasha, who later became athletics coach. Next year she won the 400 m event at the Soviet Junior Championships, and became a member of the Soviet junior athletics team. She was included into the Soviet senior team in 1977, and debuted internationally as a senior at the 1978 European Championships, where she won silver medals in the 800 and 4×400 m relay. Next year she won the 800 m event at the Universiade and placed second at the World Cup. Shortly before the 1980 Olympics, she set her first 800 m world record, running 1:54.85 in Moscow. She improved it in the Olympic final.

Olizarenko took a break after the 1980 Olympics. Earlier in 1978 she married the Ukrainian steeplechase runner Serhiy Olizarenko, and soon after the Olympics gave birth to daughter Oksana.

Olizarenko returned to athletics aiming for the 1984 Games, but those were boycotted by the Soviet Union, and she competed at the Friendship Games instead, placing third over 800 m. In the next two years she won the 1986 European title, placed second at the 1985 European Indoors and European Cup, and third at the 1985 World Cup. At the 1988 Olympics she was eliminated in the semi-finals. She retired from competitions in 1992 and later worked as an athletics coach and administrator in Odessa, Ukraine.

Olizarenko died from amyotrophic lateral sclerosis, aged 63.

References

External links

 

1953 births
2017 deaths
Soviet female middle-distance runners
Sportspeople from Bryansk
Athletes (track and field) at the 1980 Summer Olympics
Athletes (track and field) at the 1988 Summer Olympics
Olympic athletes of the Soviet Union
Olympic gold medalists for the Soviet Union
Olympic bronze medalists for the Soviet Union
World record setters in athletics (track and field)
European Athletics Championships medalists
World Athletics record holders (relay)
Medalists at the 1980 Summer Olympics
Olympic gold medalists in athletics (track and field)
Olympic bronze medalists in athletics (track and field)
Female steeplechase runners
Universiade medalists in athletics (track and field)
Goodwill Games medalists in athletics
Universiade gold medalists for the Soviet Union
Competitors at the 1986 Goodwill Games
Competitors at the 1990 Goodwill Games
Neurological disease deaths in Ukraine
Deaths from motor neuron disease
Friendship Games medalists in athletics
K. D. Ushinsky South Ukrainian National Pedagogical University alumni